Airburst is a video game developed by Strange Flavour and published by Freeverse for Mac OS. On October 25, 2007, it was announced for Xbox Live Arcade game for the Xbox 360. There is currently no release date for the Xbox 360 release but the game is available for testing on Partnernet, the private Xbox 360 developer site.

Gameplay

The game has been described as "an inverted version of Pong", in which players divert a "deadly chainsaw-bladed burster ball" with a paddle towards other players' platforms, which are made of balloons. Each player is armed with a bat which can be used to deflect the ball away from their balloons and towards their opponents. There are also a host of power-ups that affect gameplay.
The XBLA version uses ReplicaNet for online play.

AirBurst Extreme
An enhanced version was released in 2004 for Mac OS X as Airburst Extreme. There are four playable characters, and six additional characters (four new protagonists and two new antagonists) in Airburst Extreme.

In other media
On July 27, 2014, an animated short named AirBurst: The Soda of Doom screened at the San Diego Children's Film Festival at San Diego Comic-Con and featured characters from the games AirBurst and AirBurst: Extreme.

See also
Breakout clone
Warlords

References

Reviews
ATPM.com (Original)
Inside Mac Games (Extreme)

External links
Official site
Official Strange Flavour site
Strange Flavour
Freeverse
XBLA press release

2001 video games
Classic Mac OS games
Classic Mac OS-only games
Action video games
Multiplayer and single-player video games
Video games developed in the United Kingdom
Freeverse Inc. games
Strange Flavour games